DeVere is a given name and surname. Notable people with the name include:

 Tristan de Vere Cole (born 1935), British director
 Arthur Devere Thomas GC (1895–1973) was awarded the George Cross in 1931
 Bubbles DeVere, fictional character in the BBC television sketch show Little Britain
 Devere Christensen (born 1918), former American water polo player
 Luke DeVere (born 1989), Australian football (soccer) player
 Trish Van Devere (born 1943), American actress

See also
De Vere (disambiguation)

de:DeVere